Knake may refer to:

 Max Knake (born 1973), American football player
 Heidi Knake-Werner, German politician
 Knake, a Swedish sausage

See also

 
 KNAK (disambiguation)
 Knacke (disambiguation)
 Nake (disambiguation)